Kashmir Times is an Indian English language daily newspaper published from Kashmir, India. It was first published in 1954 as a weekly. In 1964 it was converted as a daily. This newspaper is the oldest and largest circulated newspaper of Jammu and Kashmir and it has a total subscription of two million it is worldwide also known as "Key to Kashmir affairs.

On 19 Oct 2020, the Srinagar Office of Kashmir Times was sealed by the Indian Government without any explanation.

References

External links 
 
 Kashmir Times E-paper
 About Kashmir Times

English-language newspapers published in India
Mass media in Jammu and Kashmir